Kadutu is a commune in Bukavu, South Kivu, Democratic Republic of the Congo.

Kadutu was one of the worst affected places during the Bukavu floods of 2022.

References

Bukavu
Communes of the Democratic Republic of the Congo